New Theatre Oxford (formerly the Apollo Theatre Oxford and The Apollo, from 1977–2003) is the main commercial theatre in Oxford, England. It has a capacity of 1,785 people; is on George Street, in the centre of the city; and puts on a wide variety of shows, including musical theatre, stand-up comedy, and concerts.

The first "New Theatre" on this site opened in 1836 and presented music hall entertainment. This was replaced in 1886 by new premises, which were the home of Oxford University Dramatic Society. The theatre was damaged by fire in 1892 and enlarged in 1908, from which time it was continuously under the management of the Dorrill family until 1972.

The present building dates from 1933 and was designed by Milburn Brothers with an art deco interior by T.P. Bennet and Sons. The colour scheme was originally in shades of deep brown with gilt friezes but in later years (circa 1980?) a multi-colour scheme was introduced, which did not reflect the original design.

There has been a theatre on the corner of George Street for almost 170 years. The first theatre built in 1836 was known commonly as the 'Vic', and later as the 'Theatre Royale' after the company that played there. Forbidden to perform plays during the University terms, the lessee of the theatre resorted to presenting 'concerts' or music hall entertainments and by 1880 the theatre had become quite run down.

At the instigation of members of both town and gown a company was formed to raise money for a theatre to be used by University and town players as well as by professionals. In February 1886 the Oxford University Dramatic Society opened the second New Theatre with 'Twelfth Night'. Designed by H.G.W. Drinkwater and with a 1000-seat capacity the second New Theatre was damaged by fire in 1892 and altered in 1908, when the seating capacity was increased to 1200.

Charles Dorrill started work in the box office when the first New Theatre opened in 1886. He became assistant manager and then, in 1908, became manager when the Dorrill family took over the venue.  The Dorrills ran the theatre as a family business for the next sixty-four years.  Charles Dorrill died suddenly in 1912 and his son, Stanley, who was working at Blackwells, the Oxford booksellers, was asked to take over at the age of 18. During his 47 years at the helm, he masterminded the rebuilding of the theatre as we know it today.  In 1933, Stanley Dorrill was determined to build 'the most luxurious and comfortable house of entertainment in England' and commissioned a new building from the well known theatre architects William and T.R. Milburn of Sunderland. The Milburns co-operated on the art-deco interior with T.P Bennett and Sons (who had designed the Saville Theatre in London). The Milburns' extensive theatre oeuvre included the Sunderland Empire and London's Dominion Theatre.

The third New Theatre was re-opened in February 1934 with a formal speech by a Miss Tawney, and with a wonderful revolving stage (mechanism extant) and increased capacity of 2000 (1710 seated) it attracted all the great dramatic actors, popular and operatic singers and musicians, music-hall entertainers and matinee idols of the age. During the Second World War, half a million troops enjoyed free entertainment at the New Theatre, earning Stanley Dorrill an MBE. The theatre published a weekly eight-page programme advertising all the many different acts, which was typeset at the local Alden's Press.
 
The New Theatre's renowned annual pantomimes (incorporating Vera Legge's Dancers) attracted many star names, and became an Oxford family Christmas ritual.  In 1963/4 Yana (real name: Pamella Guard) starred in Cinderella together with Des O'Connor as Buttons, Danny La Rue and Alan Hayes as The Ugly Sisters, and Erica Yorke as Prince Charming, as well as Jack Douglas, George Arnett and Wendy Cameron.  The following year, 1964/5, Billy Fury starred as Aladdin, appearing with his band, The Gamblers, alongside Ray Fell and Laurie Lupino Lane.  Freddie Garrity played Wishee Washee opposite Lulu as Aladdin in 1976, returning in the 1980s to play Jack in Jack and The Beanstalk with Anne Charleston, Alvin Stardust and Lynsey de Paul.  Peter Noone of Herman's Hermits played in pantomime at the New Theatre in the early 1970s together with Peter Glaze as the Dame.  1978 saw Norman Collier take to the pantomime stage in George Street.

In 1955, Stanley Dorrill became managing director and his son, John Dorrill, took over the day-to-day management of the theatre, having served an apprenticeship in London's West End.  John married Erica Yorke, who appeared as principal boy in many New Theatre Christmas pantomimes.

By the mid-1960s, with television growing in popularity, running large theatres was increasingly difficult and, with few good shows on offer, the New began to struggle.  John Dorrill took over as managing director from his father in 1965 and planned to redevelop the site as shops and offices with two smaller theatres, but Oxford City Council rejected the idea.

In latter days musicals and play productions were supplemented by pop and rock concerts.  Finally, in 1972, the Howard and Wyndham's provincial theatre chain group took over, bringing the Dorrill family's era of ownership to an end.

In 1977 Apollo Leisure took over the lease of the theatre and renamed it The Apollo. Apollo Leisure was bought out by SFX in 1999, followed by Clear Channel Entertainment in 2001. After a refurbishment in 2003 the theatre reverted to its original name  of the New Theatre, with Clear Channel Entertainment's theatre division becoming Live Nation two years later.  The Ambassador Theatre Group bought the theatre in 2009.

See also
Burton Taylor Theatre
Old Fire Station Theatre, also in George Street
Oxford Playhouse

References

External links

Theatres in Oxford
1836 establishments in England